Genc Iseni or Hyseni (born 28 March 1983, in Ferizaj) is a Kosovar Albanian retired footballer. Iseni grew up as a player at his fatherland club in the Kosovar league KF Ferizaj, where he used to play starting from his childhood.

Club career
He played for four years for Macedonian club FK Renova from Džepčište, an area where ethnic Albanians form the majority. He scored one goal against HNK Rijeka in four UEFA Intertoto Cup 2008 matches before signing a three-year contract with Ethnikos Achna.

Notes
 

1983 births
Living people
People from Ferizaj
Association football forwards
Kosovan footballers
KF Ferizaj players
FK Renova players
Ethnikos Achna FC players
FK Milano Kumanovo players
KS Gramozi Ersekë players
FK Teteks players
KF Shkëndija players
FK Bregalnica Štip players
FK Rabotnički players
Macedonian First Football League players
Cypriot First Division players
Kosovan expatriate footballers
Expatriate footballers in North Macedonia
Kosovan expatriate sportspeople in North Macedonia
Expatriate footballers in Cyprus
Kosovan expatriate sportspeople in Cyprus
Expatriate footballers in Albania
Kosovan expatriate sportspeople in Albania